Long Live the Kings is the tenth studio album released by American hip hop group Kottonmouth Kings. It was released on April 20, 2010, under Suburban Noize Records. This was the first album after adding The Dirtball into the group as well as the only album to date that featured 8 members of the Kottonmouth Kings on the cover of the album, as it was released just prior to Pakelika leaving the group. The album features the likes of Tech N9ne, Insane Clown Posse, and Big B. It features the single, "At It Again", from Johnny Richter's new solo album, "Laughing", as well as a single from The Dirtball, entitled "Mushrooms", which is said to be the sequel to a song he released earlier in his career called "Mushroom Cloud".

A deluxe edition of the album including a Super Bonus CD (containing all bonus tracks that were available through other retailers' exclusives and two tracks that were only available on the Super Bonus CD) and DVD was sold exclusively through the Suburban Noize online store.  The Super Bonus CD contained 16 tracks; the first 11 tracks were included on a bonus disc with the Best Buy edition of Long Live the Kings, tracks 12-14 were included as bonus tracks on the iTunes edition of the album, and tracks 15-16 were exclusive to the Super Bonus CD.  The bonus CD featured guest appearances by Saint Dog and Dogboy, as well as tracks from D-Loc, DJ Bobby B, and the X-Pistols (a newly formed side group, similar to Kingspade, consisting of KMK vocalists Daddy X and The Dirtball).

Track listing
All songs written and performed by Kottonmouth Kings.

Charts

References

Kottonmouth Kings albums
2010 albums
Suburban Noize Records albums